The Mount Evans Wilderness is a U.S. Wilderness Area in Arapaho National Forest and Pike National Forest about  west of Denver, Colorado. The wilderness area is named after Mount Evans.

History
The first efforts to protect the Mount Evans area involved the purchase of Echo Lake Park and Summit Lake Park as part of the system of parks designed by Frederick Law Olmsted, Jr. for the Denver Mountain Parks.  This effort led to a proposal for a National Park overlapping, to a significant extent, what is now the Mount Evans Wilderness Area.

The first large tract of land in what is now the Mount Evans Wilderness area to be formally protected was the Abyss Lake Scenic Area in Pike National Forest, protecting the Abyss Lake cirque and much of the Lake Fork of Scot Gomer Creek, a tributary of Geneva Creek that drains the south side of Mount Evans.  This area was designated prior to 1955.

References

Wilderness areas of Colorado
Protected areas established in 1980
Protected areas of Clear Creek County, Colorado
Protected areas of Park County, Colorado
Pike National Forest
Arapaho National Forest
1980 establishments in Colorado